Wyman Spooner (July 2, 1795 – November 18, 1877) was an American printer, lawyer, politician, and Wisconsin pioneer.  He was the 9th Lieutenant Governor of Wisconsin, the 10th Speaker of the Wisconsin State Assembly, and President pro tempore of the Wisconsin Senate for the 1863 session.

Background 
He was born in 1795 in Hardwick, Massachusetts, where he worked as a printer. He studied law in Vermont and was admitted to the Vermont bar. In 1835, he moved to Canton, Ohio, where he practiced law. In 1842, he moved to what is now Elkhorn, Wisconsin.

Public office 
From 1847 until 1849 he served as Walworth County's probate judge. He then became a Wisconsin Circuit Court judge. Spooner was an abolitionist and initially a Freesoiler. He was elected in 1849 and 1850 for two one-year terms as a member of the Wisconsin State Assembly from Walworth County's 5th Assembly district. He became a Republican in 1854 upon the organization of that party, and was elected to two additional terms (1857 and 1861) before advancing to the Wisconsin State Senate's 12th District from 1862 until 1863. He served three terms as the ninth Lieutenant Governor of Wisconsin, from 1864 until 1870 under Governors James T. Lewis and Lucius Fairchild.

In 1872 he supported Liberal Republican Horace Greeley for the presidency of the United States. He renounced his membership in the Republican Party entirely in 1876, heading the slate of Democratic presidential electors for nominee Samuel J. Tilden. He died in 1877 in Lyons, Wisconsin.

Sources

References 

1795 births
1877 deaths
American printers
Lieutenant Governors of Wisconsin
People from Hardwick, Massachusetts
Politicians from Canton, Ohio
People from Royalton, Vermont
People from Elkhorn, Wisconsin
Wisconsin Democrats
Wisconsin Free Soilers
19th-century American politicians
Wisconsin lawyers
Wisconsin state court judges
Wisconsin state senators
Lawyers from Canton, Ohio
Speakers of the Wisconsin State Assembly
19th-century American judges
19th-century American lawyers
19th-century American businesspeople
Republican Party members of the Wisconsin State Assembly